The Keynes Solution: The Path to Global Economic Prosperity is a nonfiction work by Paul Davidson about The General Theory of Employment, Interest and Money by John Maynard Keynes.

Synopsis
Davidson sought to explain how Keynesian economic policies can lead the way out of the financial crisis of 2007–2010.  Davidson explained how the crisis was created, gave an explanation of Keynesian policies, and then offered advice on how to reform the current international trade and monetary systems to conform to Keynes’s ideas.  In his appendix, he offered his view that “true” Keynesian theory was never taught in American universities and therefore had not been applied to the economy of the United States.

See also
 2008–2009 Keynesian resurgence

Notes and references

2009 non-fiction books
Books about John Maynard Keynes
Keynesian economics